"Hole" is the first episode of the third series of British television sitcom, Bottom. It was first broadcast on 6 January 1995. It is the last of only three bottle episodes (along with Culture and Contest) to feature only the two main characters, however it is the only one of the three to be set entirely outside of the flat. It is also a single-scene real-time episode.

Synopsis
During a night at the fair, Eddie and Richie are trapped on top of the tallest Ferris wheel in Western Europe, and the ride is scheduled to be blown up the next morning.

Plot
Richie and Eddie go to the fair for the evening and begin to talk about their night out on top of the tallest Ferris wheel in Western Europe. Richie claims that this has to be his last ride of the night as he is "Up to my three quid limit"; Eddie informs him that this ride on the Ferris wheel cost three pounds, thus implying they have just been walking around the fairground all night. They talk about an unfortunate incident on the Waltzers in which an elderly woman was covered in vomit; Eddie states "I had no idea I'd eaten so much." Richie describes that he "whizzed round three times and she looked like the creature from the swamp."

Another unfortunate incident on the ghost train proved far too terrifying for Eddie causing him to soil himself, and he explains that luckily another man on the ride passed out whose trousers he took. Richie asks how his newly acquired trousers fit. Eddie replies that they're fine but stands up to reveal a floral skirt.

To finish their fun, they decided to go on the Ferris wheel, but the burly ride operator shuts down the ride halfway through a turn leaving Richie and Eddie stranded at the top. Richie believes that the two girls he claims have been following them around the fairground all night are getting on the ride. Eddie realizes who Richie is talking about: they are "Keith and Deirdre" from the local pub's mixed couples nudie mud wrestling team. Eddie then tells Richie that the only reason they were following them was because Eddie owes Keith £50 from seventeen years ago. They spend the next half-hour getting on each other's nerves. Eddie takes a full plastic pint pot of bitter from his coat pocket and starts drinking. Then, the lights on the Ferris wheel go out and Richie realizes that they were the only ones on the whole ride. Richie tries to climb on the Ferris wheel to get help, but the electrics causes him to go back. He asks Eddie to get help and so Eddie walks on top of the Ferris wheel but the same thing happens with the electrics.

Eddie found an article on the newspaper about the Ferris wheel, not only is it the tallest it's also the oldest Ferris wheel in Western Europe, it is due to be blown up in a controlled explosion at dawn as the Ferris wheel is a death-trap and would be too expensive to dismantle. They realize that they must escape as quickly as possible and decide to make a flare in order to attract attention. Eddie reveals a bottle of Brandy in which he has also added methylated spirits, Pernod, Paint stripper, Mr Sheen, Brake fluid and Drambuie. Richie then spots a police helicopter, he lights the bottle in the same manner as a Molotov cocktail, and throws it in the air. The makeshift flare fails to burst and ends up falling back into the Ferris wheel seats causing the floor between the seats to catch fire. Thinking they will now be seen, Richie tells Eddie to start waving and shouting to the chopper, to which Eddie points out their predicament by sarcastically asking if they're shouting for help "because they're stuck on the top of a ferris wheel or because they're burning to death!" Richie realizes Eddie is right and forces him to pour his second "Emergency" glass of bitter onto the fire.

After the fire has been put out, Richie stamps on it as if he had been the brave one. This causes the floor to collapse and results in him hanging by his fingertips, Eddie pulls him back up by his hair. Eventually one of the Ferris wheel seats snaps because of Richie's weight and they are left hanging 350 feet in the air. Eddie quickly becomes a Buddhist because he wants to be reincarnated as Claudia Schiffer, Richie taking interest wanted to be reincarnated as Dannii Minogue. The Ferris wheel seats started to become looser than ever. Richie decides that they should start to pray, to which Eddie asks "Who to, Buddha?" and Richie replies "No, none of that old supermodel cobblers, the real good old C of E", they began praying to God. A giant hand stretches out to save them and the two climb on moments before the Ferris Wheel seats fall to the ground. Eddie turns to Richie and states "Although we—and indeed the whole BBC—respect people's rights to believe in whatever they wish…"; at this point he turns to the camera and breaks the fourth wall of theatre and parenthetically adds, "Because we don't want to get into the shit on this one."; turning back to Richie he finishes with "We don't actually believe in God." Richie realises Eddie's right, and the two exclaim "Shit!" as the hand disappears and the two plummet.

Notes 
This is the second time Eddie damages someone's eye in a carnival stall. In this case, it is the proprietor of 'the throwing the darts at the cards thingy.' The previous mishap was in Apocalypse, when Eddie shot the right eye of a shooting gallery stall holder.
In the outtakes on the Region 2 DVD, you can hear the full explicit dialogue that was bleeped by Eddie in the actual episode regarding their use of swearing. You can also hear this on the Audio version of this episode.

Consistency errors
 Eddie says that the loud Wurlitzer organ music played at the fairground reminded him of his dad's funeral. But in many of the other episodes Eddie says that he has no idea who his father was.
 Eddie reads in The Hammersmith Bugle that the paper's Stork margarine competition winner is Slip Digby, but in one of the Bottom Live shows, it is said that Eddie and Richie are the only people to have ever read the paper.
Eddie drops a plastic cup (from the ferris wheel) and it almost immediately drops to the ground making a noise.

Cast

References

Bottom (TV series)
1995 British television episodes
Bottle television episodes